Aspidoras rochai is a tropical freshwater fish belonging to the Corydoradinae sub-family of the  family Callichthyidae. It originates in inland waters in South America, and is found in coastal rivers in Ceará, Brazil.

It feeds on worms, benthic crustaceans, insects, and plant matter. It lays eggs in dense vegetation and adults do not guard the eggs.

See also
List of freshwater aquarium fish species

References

Callichthyidae
Freshwater fish of South America
Fish of Brazil
Taxa named by Rodolpho von Ihering
Fish described in 1907